Xera may refer to:
 Xera (band), a Spanish band
 Xera (comics), a DC Comics character
 a character played by Bianca King in the Filipino telefantasya Atlantika 
 a character in The Belgariad and The Malloreon

 Places
 the Valencian name for the municipality of Chera in the province of Valencia, Spain
 an ancient city on the Turkish island of Kekova 
 an ancient Phoenician city, now Jerez de la Frontera in the province of Cádiz in Andalusia, Spain

 Biology
 Xera (phasmid), a walking stick genus
 Geolycosa xera, McCrone, 1963, a spider species in the genus Geolycosa and the family Lycosidae found in the USA
 Hydroptila xera, a microcaddisflies species in the genus Hydroptila
 Ischnothele xera, a spider species in the genus Ischnothele and the family Dipluridae

XERA can refer to:
 XERA-AM, a radio station in San Cristóbal de las Casas, Chiapas, Mexico